Jordan competed in the Olympic Games for the first time at the 1980 Summer Olympics in Moscow, USSR.

Shooting

Open

References
Official Olympic Reports

Nations at the 1980 Summer Olympics
1980
1980 in Jordanian sport